Founded in 1983, AIDS Action Committee (AAC) of Massachusetts is a not-for-profit, community-based health organization whose mission is to stop the epidemic and related health inequities by eliminating new infections, maximizing healthier outcomes of those infected and at risk, and attacking the root causes of HIV/AIDS. Based in Boston, it is New England's oldest and largest AIDS service organization. It provides free, confidential services to more than 3,500 men, women and children living with HIV/AIDS as well as prevention services to many thousands of men, women and youth who are not living with HIV or do not know their status.

History

In 2010, AIDS Action Committee of Massachusetts merged with Cambridge Cares About AIDS into a new agency operating under the AIDS Action Committee name. The organizations joined together after nearly two years of strategic planning and stakeholder-led development. The partnership was motivated by the desire to transform the way AIDS services are delivered in the Greater Boston area. In 2014, state Representative Carl Sciortino became its executive director.

Services and advocacy
AAC provides direct services to people living with HIV in Massachusetts, including housing advocacy, legal services, drug and alcohol support and support groups. It advocates for fair and effective HIV/AIDS policy at the city, state and federal levels, focusing on science-based prevention, racial and ethnic health disparities, privacy and confidentiality, and funding. AAC also works with AIDS Action Council, which advocates primarily on the national level for people living with or affected by HIV/AIDS.

The Prevention Department at AAC provides a range of prevention and education activities designed to reduce new HIV infections, focusing on HIV prevention grounded in public health, targeted to specific populations, and not based in shame, guilt, or fear. As part of its prevention efforts, AAC operates the statewide HIV and STD hotline for both Massachusetts and Rhode Island and the Massachusetts hepatitis hotline.

AAC's community prevention outreach includes the Men's Action Life Empowerment (MALE) Center, a community resource and wellness center that integrates community outreach, life-skills education and empowerment activities, HIV safer-sex skills-building, and free rapid HIV counseling and testing for gay and bisexual men. AAC also works with other community organizations and schools to educate youth about sexual health.

Funding
In addition to grants from the Massachusetts Department of Public Health and other entities, AAC diversifies its funding through fundraising events including the annual AIDS Walk, Boston's second largest walk, and ARTcetera, a biennial art auction that features art from acclaimed artists such as Mr. Brainwash, Ryan McGinley, Mitch Weiss, Harold Eugene Edgerton.

AAC also receives 100% of the funds raised by Boomerangs, its award-winning resale store with locations in Jamaica Plain, Cambridge and West Roxbury and their sister store, Boomerangs Special Edition, located in the South End neighborhood of Boston.

On September 26, 1988, the AIDS Benefit Concert was held and profits donated to the AAC.

References

External links
 AIDS Action Committee of Massachusetts
 The AIDS Action Committee of Massachusetts, Inc. records, 1975-2000 (bulk 1987-1996) are located in the Northeastern University Libraries, Archives and Special Collections Department, Boston, MA.
 The Milburn Devenney papers, ca. 1983–1996 are located in the Northeastern University Libraries, Archives and Special Collections Department, Boston, MA.

HIV/AIDS activism
Non-profit organizations based in Boston
HIV/AIDS organizations in the United States
Organizations established in 1983